Shane Shackleton is an Australian former professional rugby league footballer who played as a  and  forward who played for the Sydney Roosters, Parramatta Eels and the Penrith Panthers in the NRL. He played twice for NSW City between 2009 and 2011.

Playing career
Shackleton made his first grade debut for the Sydney Roosters in 2005.  Shackleton's last season at the club ended with a wooden spoon in 2009.  In total, Shackleton made 65 appearances for the club.  Shackleton was selected for City in the City vs Country match on 8 May 2009. Shackleton was also eligible to play for Malta in the same year.

Shackleton signed for the Parramatta Eels for a reported three-year deal starting from 2010. He made his debut for the Parramatta Eels coming of the bench in round 1 up against St. George Illawarra, but only to suffer a horrific hamstring injury immediately ending his season.

After suffering one of the worst hamstring injuries seen by doctors, Shackleton had worked hard to get back into the side and was a regular off the bench for Parramatta.  In early 2011 when Parramatta played the Gold Coast, Shackleton scored a try after pouncing on a bomb which was the match winner for Parramatta.

In 2012, Shackleton was dropped to the Wentworthville Magpies, the Eels NRL feeder team. When asked on Facebook why he was not playing first grade, he replies, because, "Kearney's a fucker."

Soon after, Shackleton signed a two-year deal to link up with the Penrith Panthers prior to the 30 June trade deadline, resulting in an immediate switch to the new club.  In 2013, Shackleton was working part time as a labourer and also a comedian while playing for the Mount Pritchard Mounties in the Intrust Super Premiership NSW competition.
In 2016, Shackleton while playing for the Guildford Owls, was named in the Ron Massey Cup representative side to play the Queensland Rangers.

In November 2018, Shackleton played for Parramatta in the Legends of League tournament which was staged at the Central Coast Stadium in Gosford.

Career highlights
First grade debut: Sydney Roosters v Brisbane, Suncorp Stadium, 26/08/05 (Rd 25)

Footnotes

External links

NRL profile
Shane Shackleton's Parramatta Eels Profile

1982 births
Living people
Australian rugby league players
Australian people of Maltese descent
Sydney Roosters players
Parramatta Eels players
Penrith Panthers players
New South Wales City Origin rugby league team players
Mount Pritchard Mounties players
Rugby league props
Rugby league second-rows
Rugby league locks
Rugby league players from Sydney
Windsor Wolves players